Francis Raymond Evershed, 1st Baron Evershed, PC (8 August 1899 – 3 October 1966) was a British judge who served as Master of the Rolls, and subsequently became a Law Lord.

Background and education
Evershed was the son of Frank Evershed, a brewer and sportsman, and his wife Florence Helen, daughter of Thomas Lowe. He was educated at Clifton College and Balliol College, Oxford. During the First World War he was a Second Lieutenant in the Royal Engineers. In January 1923, he was called to the bar by Lincoln's Inn. He then practiced at the Chancery bar.

Legal and judicial career
Evershed was made a K.C. in 1933 and a Bencher of Lincoln's Inn in 1938. He became a High Court Judge in 1944 when he was knighted, and Lord Justice of Appeal in 1947, when he was also made a Privy Counsellor. Between 1949 and 1962, he was Master of the Rolls and served as the U.K. Member of the Permanent Court of Arbitration at The Hague in 1950.

He was raised to the peerage as Baron Evershed, of Stapenhill in the County of Derby, on 20 January 1956. In 1962, he was made a Lord of Appeal in Ordinary, and was succeeded as Master of the Rolls by Lord Denning.

Personal life

Lord Evershed married Cecily Elizabeth Joan, daughter of Sir Charles Alan Bennett, in 1928. The title became extinct on his death in October 1966, aged 67.

References

1899 births
1966 deaths
Military personnel from Staffordshire
People educated at Clifton College
20th-century English judges
Knights Bachelor
Law lords
Members of the Privy Council of the United Kingdom
Royal Engineers officers
Chancery Division judges
Masters of the Rolls
20th-century King's Counsel
English King's Counsel
Members of the Judicial Committee of the Privy Council
Place of birth missing
Place of death missing
Alumni of Balliol College, Oxford
Hereditary barons created by Elizabeth II